Karnataka State Road Transport Corporation, abbreviated and better known as KSRTC is a state-owned public road transport company in the Indian state of Karnataka.

Bus Depot
A Bus depot is an operating base of a Transport corporation. It accommodates parking, servicing and maintenance facilities for vehicles, an administrative function and facilities for staff. KSRTC have facilities for servicing and maintenance work in-house at the depot. The principal operational tasks to be carried out at a bus depot includes Allocating and Dispatching buses with crews according to schedule, Processing cash paid in by conductors or drivers. Facilities required for these purposes often includes a signing-on office where crews report for duty and a cash office where conductors or drivers (incase of Driver cum conductor bus service) pay in the cash collected during their duties and an office for managerial and supervisory staff. Chargeman, Supervisors reports to the depot manager, which is the highest designation on Management front. Adequate and satisfactory storage will be required for operating, engineering, personnel and financial records as well as for equipment such as ticket machines & tickets and associated documents such as waybills. KSRTC has its own-account maintenance workshops with specialist facilities catering Coach building (at Kengeri, Hassan, Hubli and Yadgir) and vehicle maintenance. Minimum servicing and maintenance requirements at depots include facilities for vehicle fueling, washing and cleaning, inspection pits, tools and equipment for minor routine servicing and mechanical repairs, facilities for changing and maintaining tires, storage accommodation for spare parts and office accommodation for supervisory staff. Many minor maintenance tasks are carried out while vehicles are waiting for their next trips. Another important function of a bus depot is the accommodation of buses which are not immediately required for operation or maintenance. There must be sufficient space for parking all buses based at the depot together with any others based elsewhere that require temporary accommodation and for safe maneuvering of vehicles in and out of the parking area. In the case of urban bus operations usually there will be a normal requirement for the entire fleet to be parked overnight, unless a significant number of vehicles are required for all-night operation.

Environmental friendly initiative
The environmental problems can be minimized with good design of the facilities, proper maintenance, good discipline and housekeeping. KSRTC is making efforts to increase fuel efficiency of its buses. This rely on Drivers and Maintenance staff at Bus depot. KSRTC also uses alternative bio fuel like Ethanol fuel, CNG, Millettia pinnata seed Oil (Indian Beech seed Oil) and procuring to plan Electric buses so that it can reduce carbon emissions as an environmental friendly approach. In 2017–18, KSRTC managed to save more than 3 lakh litres of diesel compared to 99,373 litres in 2016–17. The increased mileage of KSRTC buses has also resulted in savings of Rs 59.73 lakh and Rs 1.68 crore in 2016-17 and 2017–18, respectively. Depot in Mysuru also contributed to Health sector by converting Buses to ICU during COVID-19 pandemic.

List of existing Government Bus depots in Karnataka by Transport Corporation

KSRTC

KKRTC

NWKRTC

BMTC

List of upcoming Bus depots of KSRTC

See also
 List of bus stations in Karnataka
 Karnataka State Road Transport Corporation (KSRTC)
 Bengaluru Metropolitan Transport Corporation (BMTC)
 North Western Karnataka Road Transport Corporation (NWKRTC)
 Kalyana Karnataka Road Transport Corporation (KKRTC)
 Nrupatunga city bus service

References

External links
 KSRTC Official Website
 

Karnataka
Transport in Bangalore
Bus transport in Karnataka